"Oleku" is a song by Nigerian rapper Ice Prince. It features vocals by Brymo and was released as the lead single from his debut studio album Everybody Loves Ice Prince (2011). "Oleku" received positive reviews and became one of the most remixed Nigerian songs of all time. It was also one of the most popular Nigerian songs of 2010, along with Naeto C's "Ten Over Ten" and  D'banj's "Scapegoat". "Oleku" won Hottest Single of the Year at the 2011 Nigeria Entertainment Awards. It won Song of the Year at the 2011 City People Entertainment Awards and was nominated for the same award at the 2010 Dynamix All Youth Awards. Ice Prince won Song of the Year and Best Rap Single for "Oleku" and was nominated for Next Rated, Lyricist on the Roll and Best Collaboration at The Headies 2011. The music video for "Oleku" won Most Gifted Newcomer Video at the 2011 Channel O Music Video Awards and was nominated for Best Contemporary Afro Video at the 2011 Nigeria Music Video Awards (NMVA).

Background and music video
During an interview with Tim Westwood on BBC Radio 1Xtra, Ice Prince said "Oleku" translates to hard or strong. He told Factory 78 TV he began writing the song's lyrics after receiving a beat from Sarz and that Jesse Jagz played different chords and created the instrumental after hearing him sing "she feeling me boy yeah, she feeling me boy". Moreover, he said he needed more melodies and reached out to Brymo. The song's entire instrumental was recorded under 30 minutes.

The accompanying music video for "Oleku" was released in 2011. It features cameo appearances from M.I, Jesse Jagz and Wizkid. Ice Prince also told Factory 78 TV that Chocolate City did not like the first cut submitted by the director. The label told the director to redo the video. An unauthorized release of the first cut surfaced on the internet prior to the official release.

Accolades

Covers
Since the official release of "Oleku" in 2010, numerous remixes and cover versions have been released. "Oleku" is one of Nigeria's most remixed songs of all time. It was covered by Kagwe Mungai, Vector, Mugeez of R2Bees, Victoria Kimani, Sarkodie and Yung6ix, among others.

References 

2010 singles
Hip hop songs
Ice Prince songs
Song recordings produced by Jesse Jagz
Brymo songs
Yoruba-language songs
2010 songs